Yana Urqu (Quechua yana black, urqu mountain, "black mountain", hispanicized spelling Yana Orjo) is a mountain in the Andes of Peru, about  high . It is located in the Puno Region, Sandia Province, Limbani District. It lies near Ariquma.

References 

Mountains of Puno Region
Mountains of Peru